Damongo is a town and the capital of West Gonja Municipal, a municipal in the Savannah Region of northern Ghana. On 12 February 2019, Damongo was declared the capital of the newly created Savannah Region; With the coming into force of the Constitutional Instrument (CI) 105, which was signed into force by the President of the Republic of Ghana and presented to the Yagbonwura in Jubilee House 
Accra. Damongo hosts the Overlord of the Gonja Kingdom; the Yagbonwura. It is also the capital (biggest town) in the Damongo Constituency whose current MP is Hon. Samuel Abu jinapor (Minister of Lands and Natural Resources)

Damongo boast of key tourist attractions like the Mole National Park where visitors are assured of seeing a myriad of animals chief among which being elephants, the Larabanga Mosque and Mystic Stone in Larabanga with all the ancient stories surrounding their onset.

Prominent Ghanaians that were either born in or come from Damongo include John Dramani Mahama (former President of Ghana), Alban Bagbin (The Speaker of Parliament), Benjamin Kunbuor  (former Minister of Defence), Michael Abu Sakara Foster (former Presidential candidate of CPP).

Education
The town of Damongo is an educational hub for a town of its size. Aside the many basic schools, Damongo has 3 senior high schools: the Damongo Senior High School, Ndewura Jakpa Secondary Technical High School, St Annes Girls Senior High School. There is also the Damongo Agricultural Collage and the Damongo Health Assistant School.

References

Populated places in the Savannah Region (Ghana)